Hans Pieren (born 23 January 1962) is a Swiss former alpine skier who competed in the 1988 Winter Olympics and 1992 Winter Olympics.

References

External links
 
 

1962 births
Living people
Swiss male alpine skiers
Olympic alpine skiers of Switzerland
Alpine skiers at the 1988 Winter Olympics
Alpine skiers at the 1992 Winter Olympics
20th-century Swiss people